The list of ship decommissionings in 1947 includes a chronological list of all ships decommissioned in 1947.


See also

References

1947
 Ship decommissionings
Ship